Dolichocoxys is a genus of flies in the family Tachinidae.

Species
Dolichocoxys brevis Zhou, Wei & Luo, 2012
Dolichocoxys femoralis Townsend, 1927
Dolichocoxys flavibasis Zhou, Wei & Luo, 2012
Dolichocoxys obscurus Zhou, Wei & Luo, 2012
Dolichocoxys rossica Mesnil, 1963
Dolichocoxys unisetus Zhi, Liu & Zhang, 2016
Dolichocoxys wangi Zhang & Liu, 2008

References

Diptera of Asia
Exoristinae
Tachinidae genera
Taxa named by Charles Henry Tyler Townsend